is a town located in Okhotsk Subprefecture, Hokkaido, Japan.

As of September 2016, the town has an estimated population of 5,011 and a population density of 7 persons per km2. The total area is 716.60 km2.

History
1919: Tsubetsu Village founded, split from Bihoro Village (now Town).
1921: Part of Bihoro Village incorporated.
1946: Tsubetsu Village becomes Tsubetsu Town.

Climate

Mascot

He is an honest and energetic mizunara wood log bear kamuy who likes to play rugby. As such, he trains rugby players from all over the world.

References

External links

Official Website 

Towns in Hokkaido